Rogelia Romo (born 20 March 1943) is a Mexican volleyball player. She competed in the women's tournament at the 1968 Summer Olympics.

References

1943 births
Living people
Mexican women's volleyball players
Olympic volleyball players of Mexico
Volleyball players at the 1968 Summer Olympics
Sportspeople from Guadalajara, Jalisco